Margaret of Austria (German: Margarethe von Österreich; 16 February 1536 – 12 March 1567) was a co-founder of the Ladies' Convent of Hall (Haller Damenstift), born an archduchess of Austria from the House of Habsburg as the daughter of Ferdinand I, Holy Roman Emperor.

Life

Early life 
Archduchess Margaret of Austria was born in Innsburck, County of Tyrol (in present-day Austria) on 16 February 1536 as the ninth child and seventh daughter of Ferdinand I, Holy Roman Emperor (1503–1564) and his wife, born Princess Anna of Bohemia and Hungary (1503–1547). She had a strict, religious upbringing with a heavy influence from Jesuits.

Life as a nun 
Margaret and her older sister Archduchess Magdalena of Austria  had long expressed a desire to remain unmarried and create a community of pious women, which their father had a difficult time accepting. After his death in 1564 they both became nuns in Hall in Tirol, County of Tyrol, founding the Ladies' Convent of Hall (Haller Damenstift) under the supervision of the Society of Jesus with her sisters Archduchesses Magdalena (1532–1590) and Helena (1543–1574) of Austria. She died there on 12 March 1567 at the age of 31.

References 

1536 births
1567 deaths
16th-century House of Habsburg
16th-century Austrian women
16th-century Roman Catholic nuns
Daughters of emperors
Austrian princesses
Bohemian princesses
Hungarian princesses
Children of Ferdinand I, Holy Roman Emperor
Daughters of kings
Austrian Roman Catholic religious sisters and nuns
People from Innsbruck